William Butler Tooth was an English born Australian politician and pastoralist, who from 1858–1859 represented the Electoral district of United Pastoral Districts of Moreton, Wide Bay, Burnett, Maranoa, Leichhardt and Port Curtis in the New South Wales Legislative Assembly.

He was the founder of the Union Club and was a member of the committees of the Sydney Club, the Society for Suppression of Cattle Stealing and the Agricultural Society of New South Wales.

Tooth married Lucy Ann Harris (died 1916) in Sydney in 1850 and together had nine children. He died in Toowoomba in 1876 and was buried in Drayton and Toowoomba Cemetery.

References 

 

1823 births
1876 deaths
Members of the New South Wales Legislative Assembly
Burials in Drayton and Toowoomba Cemetery
19th-century Australian politicians
English emigrants to Australia
People from Cranbrook, Kent